John Bartholomew was Archdeacon of Barnstaple
from 1847 to 1865.

He was educated at Corpus Christi College, Oxford (BA 1813, MA 1820), both made deacon and ordained priest in 1817 by the Bishop of Exeter.
He was appointed Curate of Withycombe Rawleigh in 1817, and of Sowton in 1819, Rector of Lympstone in 1820 and, additionally, a Prebendary of Exeter in 1831. In 1860, he had been Rector of Morchard Bishop since 1831, Canon residentiary of Exeter since 1840, and Archdeacon of Barnstaple since 1847.

References

Archdeacons of Barnstaple
19th-century English people